Conyzicola lurida is a Gram-positive, non-spore-forming and rod-shaped bacterium from the genus of Conyzicola which has been isolated from the surface of the root of the plant Conyza canadensis.

References

Microbacteriaceae
Bacteria described in 2014